Rahab is a prominent character in the Book of Joshua. It is a girl's name but now rare.

Rahab may also refer to:

 Rahab (term), a Hebrew term meaning:
 A Hebrew term meaning spacious place or rage, fierceness, insolence, pride.
 A mythical sea monster mentioned in the Book of Psalms and elsewhere.
 A poetic term for Egypt.
 Rahab (Legacy of Kain), a video game character.

See also 
 Rehab (disambiguation)